FBK Balkan is a Swedish football club located in the district Rosengård of Malmö. The club was founded on 22 November 1962. They currently play in Division 2 Södra Götaland. The club comes from a Malmö neighbourhood known for its very large immigrant community. Balkan is most famous for being the club where Zlatan Ibrahimović started playing football. Other notable former players for the team include Goran Slavkovski and Valentino Lai.

History
FBK Balkan was founded on 22 November 1962 in Malmö by Yugoslav immigrants and is named after the Balkans. The club spent many seasons in Swedish Division 6 but later found their way as high as Division 2. The club is one of the oldest immigrants association in Europe. Players of many nationalities have played at the club, from former Yugoslavia (Serbia, Bosnia and Herzegovina, Slovenia, Croatia, Montenegro, North Macedonia, Kosovo), Romania, Albania, Bulgaria and Turkey.

The club is affiliated to the Skånes Fotbollförbund.

Season to season

Attendances
In recent seasons, FBK Balkan have had the following average attendances:

References

External links
 FBK Balkan website

Association football clubs established in 1962
Football clubs in Malmö
1962 establishments in Sweden
Diaspora football clubs in Sweden
Yugoslav diaspora